Admiral Peter Aplin (1753 – 17 April 1817) was an English admiral.

Life
He was still in her at Yorktown in the following October, when she was destroyed by the enemy's red-hot shot; after which he served, with his crew, on shore under the orders of Lord Cornwallis. 
He continued in this command for nearly two years, when he was promoted to flag rank. 
As an admiral, however, he never served, although, he passed through the several gradations by seniority, and attained the high rank of admiral of the white before his death, which occurred on 17 April 1817.

Post script
In 1802 the British East India Company named a vessel for him, the Admiral Aplin; unfortunately a French privateer captured her in 1804 near Mauritius.

Notes

References

External links
 Peter Aplin Logbooks at the William L. Clements Library

1753 births
1817 deaths
Royal Navy admirals
Royal Navy personnel of the American Revolutionary War
Royal Navy personnel of the French Revolutionary Wars